The 1950 Oklahoma A&M Cowboys football team represented Oklahoma Agricultural and Mechanical College (later renamed Oklahoma State University–Stillwater) in the Missouri Valley Conference during the 1950 college football season.

At the end of the 1949 season, Jim Lookabaugh resigned after 11 years as Oklahoma A&M's head football coach, and Jennings B. Whitworth, an assistant coach at Georgia, was hired as his replacement.
In their first season under coach Whitworth, the Cowboys compiled a 4–6–1 record (1–2–1 against conference opponents), tied for fourth place in the conference, and were outscored by opponents by a combined total of 259 to 159. Two of the Cowboys' games resulted in losses to teams ranked No. 1 (Oklahoma, 14–41) and No. 2 (SMU, 0–56) in the AP Poll.

On offense, the 1950 team averaged 14.5 points, 149.45 rushing yards, and 83.09 passing yards per game.  On defense, the team allowed an average of 23.5 points, 232.82 rushing yards and 82.18 passing yards per game. The team's statistical leaders included halfback Bob Cook with 411 rushing yards (albeit on 205 carries) and 654 passing yards, Arlen McNeil with 263 receiving yards, and Wayne Johnson with six interceptions.

Bob Cook received first-team All-Missouri Valley Conference honors.

The team played its home games at Lewis Field in Stillwater, Oklahoma. Prior to the 1950 season, 10,600 seats were added as part of renovations to the north side, increasing the seating capacity to 39,000.

Schedule

After the season

The 1951 NFL Draft was held on January 18–19, 1951. The following Cowboys were selected.

References

Oklahoma AandM
Oklahoma State Cowboys football seasons
Oklahoma AandM Football